This is a list of people from Sierra Leone who have articles on Wikipedia, or are unambiguously qualified for one.

Okere Adams
John Akar
Roda Antar
George Banda-Thomas
Alimamy Pallo Bangura
Brima Bangura
Hawanatu Bangura
John Amadu Bangura
Zainab Bangura
Herbert Bankole-Bright
Eunice Barber
Ishmael Beah
John Oponjo Benjamin
Ernest Beoku-Betts
Solomon Berewa
Nabih Berri
Julius Maada Bio
Sam Bockarie
Tamba Borbor-Sawyer
Aluspah Brewah
Alex Tamba Brima
Abass Bundu
William John Campbell
Tom Carew
Adelaide Casely-Hayford
Albert Cole
Christopher Cole
Abdulai Conteh
Kandeh Baba Conteh
Edmund Cowan
Mohamed B. Daramy
J. B. Dauda
Albert Joe Demby
Sarway Dollar
Horace Dove-Edwin
Ahmed Ramadan Dumbuya
Dala Modu Dumbuya
Idris Elba
John Ezzidio
Moinina Fofana
Cyril Foray
Joseph Ganda
Shirley Gbujama
Herbert George-Williams
Ella Koblo Gulama
Prince Harding
Abubakarr Jalloh (politician)
Amadu Jalloh
Lamin Jusu Jarka
Albert Jarrett
Bomba Jawara
Winstanley Bankole Johnson
Henry M. Joko-Smart
Andrew Juxon-Smith
Haja Afsatu Kabba
Karamoh Kabba
Ahmad Tejan Kabbah
Patricia Kabbah
Septimus Kaikai
Tamba Kaingbanja
Mohamed Kallon
Morris Kallon
Brima Bazzy Kamara
Mohamed Lamin Kamara
Samura Kamara
Samuel Komba Kambo
Santigie Borbor Kanu
Yahya Kanu
John Karefa-Smart
Ibrahim Kargbo
Sidney Kargbo
Kadijatu Kebbay
Allieu Kondewa
Abdul Karim Koroma
Abu Aiah Koroma
Ernest Bai Koroma
Johnny Paul Koroma
Momodu Koroma
Sorie Ibrahim Koroma
Augustine Kortu
David Lansana
John Leigh (ambassador)
Samuel Lewis (Sierra Leone)
Henry Josiah Lightfoot Boston
Desmond Luke
Andrew Lungay
Albert Margai
Charles Margai
Milton Margai
Lamin Massaquoi
Tamba Songu M'briwa
Obi Metzger
Francis Minah
Jamil Sahid Mohamed
Joseph Saidu Momoh
Momodu Munu
Namina Forna
Solomon Musa
Arthur Nelson-Williams
Abioseh Nicol
Tom Nyuma
Bai Koblo Pathbana II
Joe Robert Pemagbi
Patricia Piccinini
Farid Raymond-Anthony
Alhaji Shekuba Saccoh
John Saab
Samuel Sam-Sumana
Kabba Samura
Foday Sankoh
Lamina Sankoh
Wusu Sannoh
Solomon G. Seisay
Tinga Seisay
Abdul Serry-Kamal
Issa Sesay
Kadi Sesay
Muwahid Sesay
Mohamed Sillah
Siaka Stevens
Valentine Strasser
Sheriff Suma
Jeneba Tarmoh
John 'Johnny' Taylor
Banja Tejan-Sie
John Henry Malamah Thomas
Bankole Timothy
Michael Tommy
Hindolo Trye
B. J. Tucker
Andrew Turay
Edward Turay
Peter Vandy
Isaac Wallace-Johnson
Madieu Williams
Julius Wobay
Amadu Wurie
Madam Yoko
Kandeh Yumkella